Dutch India consisted of the settlements and trading posts of the Dutch East India Company on the Indian subcontinent. It is only used as a geographical definition, as there was never a political authority ruling all Dutch India. Instead, Dutch India was divided into the governorates Dutch Ceylon and Dutch Coromandel, the commandment Dutch Malabar, and the directorates Dutch Bengal and Dutch Suratte.

The Dutch Indies, on the other hand, were the Dutch East Indies (present-day Indonesia) and the Dutch West Indies (present-day Suriname and the former Netherlands Antilles).

History
Dutch presence on the Indian subcontinent lasted from 1605 to 1825. Merchants of the Dutch East India Company first established themselves in Dutch Coromandel, notably Pulicat, as they were looking for textiles to exchange with the spices they traded in the East Indies. Dutch Suratte and Dutch Bengal were established in 1616 and 1627 respectively. After the Dutch conquered Ceylon from the Portuguese in 1656, they took the Portuguese forts on the Malabar coast five years later as well, as both are major spice producers, so as to create a Dutch monopoly for the spice trade.

Apart from textiles, the items traded in Dutch India include precious stones, indigo, and silk across the Indian Peninsula, saltpetre and opium in Dutch Bengal, and pepper in Dutch Malabar. Indian slaves were exported to the Spice Islands and the Cape Colony. 

In the second half of the eighteenth century the Dutch lost their influence more and more. The Kew Letters relinquished all Dutch colonies to the British, to prevent them from being overrun by the French. Although Dutch Coromandel and Dutch Bengal were restored to Dutch rule by virtue of the Anglo-Dutch Treaty of 1814, they returned to British rule owing to the provisions of the Anglo-Dutch Treaty of 1824. Under the terms of the treaty, all transfers of property and establishments were to take place on 1 March 1825. By the middle of 1825, therefore, the Dutch had lost their last trading posts in India.

Coinage

During the days when the Dutch were commercially active in India, they operated several mints, at Cochin, Masulipatnam, Nagapatam (or Negapatam), Pondicherry (for the five years 1693-98 when the Dutch had gained control from the French), and Pulicat. The coins were all modelled on the local coinages.

Map

Gallery

See also
British India
Danish India
French India
India–Netherlands relations
Bangladesh–Netherlands relations
Portuguese India
Colonial India

References

External links
Coins of Dutch India
India World Statesmen - India

 
European colonisation in Asia
Former colonies in Asia
Former settlements and colonies of the Dutch East India Company
Former trading posts of the Dutch East India Company
1605 establishments in Dutch India
1825 disestablishments in Dutch India
India